The 1969 Stockholm Open was a tennis tournament played on indoor hard courts in Stockholm, Sweden. The tournament was held from November 1 through November 7, 1969. Unseeded Nikola Pilić defeated Ilie Năstase in the final, 6–4, 4–6, 6–2.

Seeds

  Rod Laver (quarterfinals)
  Tony Roche (first round)
  Roy Emerson (first round)
  Andrés Gimeno (quarterfinals)
  Cliff Drysdale (first round)
  Marty Riessen (second round)
  Stan Smith (semifinals)
  Fred Stolle (semifinals)

Main draw

Finals

Top half

Bottom half

References

Stockholm Open